Datuk Chong Sin Woon (born 25 December 1973) is a Malaysian politician who served as the Deputy Minister of Education II from a Cabinet reshuffle in July 2015 to the collapse of the Barisan Nasional (BN) administration in May 2018. He served as the Senator from April 2014 to April 2017 for the first term and reappointed to serve from April 2017 to April 2020 for the second term for 6 years in total, a term is fixed for 3 years. He is a member of the Malaysian Chinese Association (MCA), a major component party of the BN coalition and is aligned with the ruling Perikatan Nasional (PN) coalition as well as its Secretary-General since September 2019 after the resignation of his predecessor Chew Mei Fun.

Early life
Chong was born in Negeri Sembilan to Chong Fatt Yuen and Leaw Moi. His parents were rubber tappers. Chong is the youngest among seven siblings. As a child, Chong delivered newspapers to supplement his family's income. He attended SJKC Kuo Min and he went on to spend eight years in SM Dato Mohd Said in Nilai, Negeri Sembilan. Chong graduated with a bachelor's degree in economics from National University of Malaysia in 1999.

Political career
Upon his graduation in 1999, Chong joined MCA in 2001. He won the MCA Youth Chief's post in 2013 and appointed as senator in 2014. In 2015 he was appointed as Deputy Minister of Education II by the then-prime minister, Najib Razak in a Cabinet reshuffle. Chong was reappointed as senator in 2017.

In 2018 Malaysian general election, Chong contested for the Seremban federal seat against the opposition Democratic Action Party (DAP) National Organising Secretary Anthony Loke and was defeated. Chong and his MCA Youth concedes defeat and is ready to position itself as the opposition to "keep an eye" on the new Pakatan Harapan (PH) administration in 2018. In September 2019, Chew Mei Fun resigned as the Secretary-General of MCA and Chong was appointed to take over the position and has served since then. However, 21 months later in February 2020, PH collapsed due to party-hopping and was replaced with Perikatan Nasional (PN) administration led by Prime Minister and President of the Malaysian United Indigenous Party (BERSATU) Muhyiddin Yassin in March 2020. MCA, which is in BN, is aligned with PN and hence he was appointed Chairman of the Port Klang Authority by the PN administration in April 2020.

Controversy
On 5 November 2017, Chong has apologised for his insensitive  'tokong'  or 'deity-like' remarks and jibe he had made over Penang Chief Minister Lim Guan Eng in his speech during the 64th MCA general assembly amid Penang's devastating floods situation.

Election results
{| class="wikitable" style="margin:0.5em ; font-size:95%"
|+ Parliament of Malaysia !|Year
!|Constituency
!colspan=2|Candidate
!|Votes
!|Pct
!colspan=2|Opponent(s)
!|Votes
!|Pct
!|Ballots cast
!|Majority
!|Turnout
|-
| rowspan=2|2018
| rowspan=2|P128 Seremban, Negeri Sembilan
| rowspan=2  |
| rowspan=2|Chong Sin Woon (MCA)
| rowspan=2 align="right" |24,809
| rowspan=2|27.02%
| |
|Loke Siew Fook (DAP) 
|align="right" |55,503|60.45%| rowspan=2|93,254
| rowspan=2|30,694
| rowspan=2|84.65%
|-
| |
|
|11,506
|12.53%
|-
| rowspan="3" |2022
| rowspan=3|P080 Raub, Pahang
| rowspan="3"  |
| rowspan="3" | (MCA)
| rowspan="3" align="right" |16,939
| rowspan="3" |30.12%
|  |
|Chow Yu Hui (DAP)| align="right" |21,613|38.43%| rowspan="3" |56,235
| rowspan="3" |4,357
| rowspan="3" |74.92%
|-
| bgcolor= |
|Fakrunizam Ibrahim (BERSATU) 
|17,256
| align="right" |30.69%
|-
|bgcolor= | 
|Norkhairul Anuar Mohamed Nor (PEJUANG) 
|align=right|427
|align="right" |0.76%
|}

 Honours 
  :
  Companion Class II of the Exalted Order of Malacca (DPSM) – Datuk''' (2016)

See also

 Seremban (federal constituency)

References

1973 births
Living people
People from Negeri Sembilan
Malaysian people of Hakka descent
Malaysian people of Chinese descent
Malaysian Buddhists
Malaysian Chinese Association politicians
Members of the Dewan Negara
National University of Malaysia alumni
21st-century Malaysian politicians